Sweden  competed at the inaugural World Beach Games in Doha, Qatar from 12 to 16 October 2019. In total, athletes representing Sweden won one bronze medal and the country finished in 32nd place in the medal table.

Medal summary

Medalists

References 

Nations at the 2019 World Beach Games
World Beach Games